Cäcilia Böhm-Wendt (born 4 May 1875) was an Austrian physicist, who conducted research on radioactivity.

Early life and education
She was born Cäcilia Wendt on 4 May 1875 in Troppau, Silesia. She studied at the University of Vienna from 1896 to 1900, where she published work on rational values of trigonometric functions, receiving a doctoral degree for research on special functions of importance in mathematical physics.

Career
In 1900, she became the first woman to hold the position of probationary teacher at Vienna's gymnasium for young women (gymnasiale Mädchenschule). She worked at the University of Vienna's Physical Institute, investigating how the radiation produced by radium created electrical conductivity in dielectric materials (petroleum ether and vaseline oil). She then obtained the mobility of the resulting ions. At the Institute, she was a research collaborator with its director, Egon von Schweidler.

In 1909, she and Maria Sadzewicz were the only two women in Austria to publish physics papers; at this time, only about 1% of physicists were women.

References

20th-century Austrian physicists
Austrian women physicists
1875 births
Year of death missing
Place of death missing
University of Vienna alumni